Barium hydroxide is a chemical compound with the chemical formula Ba(OH)2.  The monohydrate (x = 1), known as baryta or baryta-water, is one of the principal compounds of barium. This white granular monohydrate is the usual commercial form.

Preparation and structure
Barium hydroxide can be prepared by dissolving barium oxide (BaO) in water:

BaO + H2O → Ba(OH)2

It crystallises as the octahydrate, which converts to the monohydrate upon heating in air.  At  100 °C in a vacuum, the monohydrate will yield BaO and water.  The monohydrate adopts a layered structure (see picture above).  The Ba2+ centers adopt a square anti-prismatic geometry.  Each Ba2+ center is bound by two water ligands and six hydroxide ligands, which are respectively doubly and triply bridging to neighboring Ba2+ centre sites.  In the octahydrate, the individual Ba2+ centers are again eight coordinate but do not share ligands.

Uses
Industrially, barium hydroxide is used as the precursor to other barium compounds.  The monohydrate is used to dehydrate and remove sulfate from various products.  This application exploits the very low solubility of barium sulfate.  This industrial application is also applied to laboratory uses.

Laboratory uses
Barium hydroxide is used in analytical chemistry for the titration of weak acids, particularly organic acids. Its clear aqueous solution is guaranteed to be free of carbonate, unlike those of sodium hydroxide and potassium hydroxide, as barium carbonate is insoluble in water. This allows the use of indicators such as phenolphthalein or thymolphthalein (with alkaline colour changes) without the risk of titration errors due to the presence of carbonate ions, which are much less basic.

Barium hydroxide is occasionally used in organic synthesis as a strong base, for example for the hydrolysis of esters and nitriles, and as a base in aldol condensations.

There are several uses for barium hydroxide such as to hydrolyse one of the two equivalent ester groups in dimethyl hendecanedioate.

Barium hydroxide has also been used, as well, in the decarboxylation of amino acids liberating barium carbonate in the process.

It is also used in the preparation of cyclopentanone, diacetone alcohol and D-gulonic γ-lactone.

Reactions
Barium hydroxide decomposes to barium oxide when heated to 800 °C.  Reaction with carbon dioxide gives barium carbonate. Its aqueous solution, being highly alkaline, undergoes neutralization reactions with acids due to it being a strong base. It is especially useful on reactions that require the titrations of weak organic acids. Thus, it forms barium sulfate and barium phosphate with sulfuric  and phosphoric acids, respectively.  Reaction with hydrogen sulfide produces barium sulfide.  Precipitation of many insoluble, or less soluble barium salts, may result from double replacement reaction when a barium hydroxide aqueous solution is mixed with many solutions of other metal salts.

Reactions of barium hydroxide with ammonium salts are strongly endothermic. The reaction of barium hydroxide octahydrate with ammonium chloride or ammonium thiocyanate is often used as a classroom chemistry demonstration, producing temperatures cold enough to freeze water and enough water to dissolve the resulting mixture.

Safety
Barium hydroxide presents the same hazards such as skin irritation and burns as well as eye damage, just as the other strong bases and as other water-soluble barium compounds: it is corrosive and toxic.

See also
 Baralyme

References

External links
Material Safety Data Sheet (MSDS)

Barium compounds
Hydroxides